Cwmamman Urban District was an Urban District in Carmarthenshire, Wales, from 1894 to 1974 when it was absorbed into Dinefwr.

External links
 

Carmarthenshire
Urban districts of Wales